Events from the year 1889 in Denmark.

Incumbents
 Monarch – Christian IX
 Prime minister – J. B. S. Estrup

Events

Sports
 26 February – Akademisk Boldklub is founded.

Births
 3 February – Carl Theodor Dreyer, film director (died 1968)
 16 May – Maria Garland, actor (died 1967)
 29 May – Aksel Agerby, composer, organist, and music administrator (died 1942)
 30 May – Anker Engelund, engineer and university professor (died 1861)
 30 August – Bodil Ipsen, actress (died 1964)
 4 September – Aage Rasmussen, photographer and track and field athlete (died 1983)

Deaths
  2 May – Edward Tesdorpf, landowner (born 1817)
  17 July – Auguste Sophie Friederike, princess of Hesse-Kassel (born 1823)
 28 November – Erling Eckersberg, engraver (born 1808)

References

 
1880s in Denmark
Denmark
Years of the 19th century in Denmark